Cepeda may refer to:

Cepeda (surname)

Places
Cañada de Cepeda, Buenos Aires Province, Argentina
Castelões de Cepeda, former civil parish in the municipality of Paredes, Portugal
Cepeda la Mora, town in Ávila Province, Spain
Cepeda, Salamanca, Spain
Dehesa de la Cepeda, an exclave of Madrid surrounded by Castile and León
Fontoria de Cepeda, small city in León Province, Spain
General Cepeda, city in Coahuila, Mexico
La Cepeda, comarca in León Province, Spain
Magaz de Cepeda, municipality in the province of León, Castile and León, Spain

Battles
Battle of Cepeda (1820)
Battle of Cepeda (1859)